Z number may refer to:

Z-number, the subject of Mahler's 3/2 problem
Composition designator for list of compositions by Henry Purcell
Z score